Laughing Planet is a restaurant chain based in Portland, Oregon, United States. The chain began in the U.S. state of Indiana, where founder Richard Satnick opened the first restaurant. By 2015, Laughing Planet had received numerous awards including "Best of Portland" and "Best Kid-Friendly Restaurant".

As of 2020, Laughing Planet had a total of seventeen restaurant chains in the Portland metropolitan area, Vancouver/Camas, Eugene, Bend, Corvallis, and Reno.

History

The chain was founded by Richard Satnick, who opened the first restaurant in Bloomington, Indiana, in 1995. Satnick relocated to Portland, Oregon in 2000. He moved operations and expanded the chain into Corvallis and Eugene.

Satnick sold the chain for an undisclosed amount in 2012; Laughing Planet had ten locations at the time. The company began offering employees up to 12 weeks of paid parental leave in 2015.

Laughing Planet had ten locations in 10 restaurants in the Portland metropolitan area, two each in Eugene and Reno, Nevada, and one each in Bend and Corvallis, as of late 2018.

As part of the COVID-19 pandemic, the company received between $1 million and $2 million in federally backed small business loan from Beneficial State Bank as part of the Paycheck Protection Program. The company stated it would allow them to retain 245 jobs.

Reception

Laughing Planet ranked tenth in The Oregonian 2017 readers' poll of Portland's best inexpensive restaurants.

The chain has been recognized by Willamette Week "Best of Portland" readers' poll many times. The company was a runner-up in the "Best Kid-Friendly Restaurant" category in 2015. In 2016, Laughing Planet won in the "Best Kid-Friendly Restaurant" category, and placed third in the "Best Vegetarian Restaurant", "Best Paleo Options", and "Best Place to Eat Sustainably" categories. The chain won in the "Best Kid-Friendly Restaurant" category, and was runner-up in the "Best Vegetarian Restaurant" and "Best Place to Eat Sustainably" categories in 2017.

References

External links

 

1995 establishments in Indiana
Companies based in Portland, Oregon
Restaurant chains in the United States
Restaurants established in 1995
Restaurants in Portland, Oregon
Restaurants in Bend, Oregon
Restaurants in Eugene, Oregon